Zeitgeist is the intellectual fashion or dominant school of thought of a certain period.

Zeitgeist may also refer to:

Music

Groups
Zeitgeist (ensemble), a music ensemble from St. Paul, Minnesota
Zeigeist , a Swedish electronic music band and art constellation (2006-2009)
former name of the band The Reivers from Austin, Texas

Albums and songs

Zeitgeist (Levellers album) (1995)
Zeitgeist compilation albums, a three-volume compilation released by IF? Records (1995-1997)
Zeitgeist (Schiller album) (1999)
Zeitgeist EP, an album by Frogcircus (2002)
Zeitgeist (The Smashing Pumpkins album) (2007)
Zeitgeist, an EP by Tangerine Dream (2010)
Zeitgeist, an album by Camo & Krooked (2013)
"Zeitgeist", a song by Black Sabbath from the album 13 (2013)

Other
Zeitgeist (comics), a Marvel comic book superhero
Zeitgeist (film company), a Danish independent film company
Zeitgeist (film series), a series of films by Peter Joseph (2007–2011)
The Zeitgeist Movement, a social movement associated with Peter Joseph and his film series
Zeitgeist (free software), a GNOME 3.0 activity logging system similar to Lifestream
Zeitgeist Films, an American independent film company
Zeitgeist, a 2000 novel by Bruce Sterling
Zeitgeist, a satirical video blog hosted by Willie Geist
Google Zeitgeist (2005), a Google report of the fastest changing and most popular online searches
Jupiter Strike, a 1995 video game released as Zeitgeist in Japan

See also
Epochalism, an attitude of respect for the progressive spirit of the age and for social and technological advancement
Spirit of the age (disambiguation)